Ezenwa-Ohaeto (1958 — 2005) was a Nigerian poet, short story writer and academic. He was one of the first Nigerians to publish poems written in pidgin English. He died in Cambridge in 2005.

Life and career 
Ezenwa-Ohaeto  was born on 31 March 1958 to Michael Ogbonnaya Ohaeto and Rebecca Ohaeto in Ife Ezinihite in Mbaise local government area of Imo State. 
He began his primary education at St. Augustine Grammar School, Nkwerre in 1971. He completed his secondary education in 1975 with distinction in arts and sciences  with a Grade One certificate. He studied at the University of Nigeria under the tutelage of novelist Chinua Achebe and critic Donatus Nwoga from 1971 to 1979. He subsequently graduated with a Bachelor of Arts with honours in English. He earned a Masters of Arts from UNN with a scholarship from the Imo state government in 1982. 
In 1991, he was awarded a PhD in literature from University of Benin.

Ezenwa-Ohaeto began his teaching career in 1980 as an assistant lecturer in   Ahmadu Bello University. From 1982 to 1992 he taught at Anambra State College of Education, Awka as a lecturer. He then taught at Alvan Ikoku Federal College of Education as an assistant professor from 1992 to 1998  and as a senior lecturer at Nnamdi Azikiwe University from 1998 until his death in 2005.

He is the father of Chinua Ezenwa-Ohaeto.

Awards and recognitions 
 BBC Arts and Africa Poetry Award
 Association of Nigerian Authors/Cadbury Poetry Award
 Fellow, African Studies Centre, University of Cambridge

Bibliography 
Chants of a Minstrel  
I Wan Bi President 
Songs of a Traveller
Chinua Achebe: A Biography
The Voice of the Night Masquerade

References

Citation 
 

Nigerian poets
Nigerian short story writers
Nigerian academics
Igbo short story writers
1958 births
2005 deaths